Carolina is the second studio album by American country music artist Eric Church. It was released on March 24, 2009 via Capitol Records Nashville. "Love Your Love the Most", the album's lead-off single, became Church's first Top 10 hit on the Billboard Hot Country Songs chart. This song follows the non-album single "His Kind of Money (My Kind of Love)", which peaked outside the top 40 in mid-2008. As of November 29, 2013, the album has sold 715,000 copies in the US, and it has been certified Platinum by the Recording Industry Association of America (RIAA) in 2016.

Singles

"Love Your Love the Most"

"Love Your Love the Most" was released as the album's lead-off single. It entered the top 40 on the Hot Country Songs in April 2009, becoming his first top 40 hit since "Guys Like Me" in early 2007, as well as his first top ten country hit peaking at No. 10 in October 2009.

"Hell on the Heart"

"Hell on the Heart" was released as the second single in October, and entered the top 40 in November.

"Smoke a Little Smoke"

"Smoke a Little Smoke" was released as the album's third single in June 2010.

Critical reception

Upon its release, Carolina received generally positive reviews from most music critics. At Metacritic, which assigns a normalized rating out of 100 to reviews from mainstream critics, the album received an average score of 76, based on 4 reviews, which indicates "generally favorable reviews".

Stephen Thomas Erlewine reviewed the album for AllMusic and gave it three-and-a-half stars out of five. He said that "Church sings like a manicured model, striking all the poses and hitting all the notes, but missing that essential grit. Of course, he isn't helped out by the production of his second album Carolina, a recording that gleams pristine, designed for two drinks at an after-work smokeless bar, not a long booze-filled night at a honky tonk dive. It's a commercial sound, one that puts Carolina firmly within the mainstream, and it also fits the contours of Church's voice."

Jonathan Keefe of Slant Magazine was less favorable, calling it "a strident stab at the mainstream commercial acceptance that has thus far eluded the singer-songwriter." He cited the production of "Smoke a Little Smoke" and "Longer Gone" for "that actually reinforc[ing] the tones of those songs," giving the album two stars out of five.

Commercial performance
As of November 2013 the album has sold 715,000 copies.  The album was certified Platinum by the RIAA for combined sales and streams of one million units on August 31, 2016.

Track listing

Personnel
Credits adapted from the Carolina liner notes.

Musicians

Bruce Bouton – dobro, pedal steel guitar
Luke Bulla – fiddle
Mark Casstevens – banjo, acoustic guitar
Nathan Chapman – acoustic guitar, background vocals
Stephanie Chapman – background vocals
Eric Church – acoustic guitar, electric guitar, lead vocals
J. T. Corenflos – electric guitar
Steve Fishell – dobro, pedal steel guitar
Lee Hendricks – bass guitar
Jedd Hughes – acoustic guitar, mandolin
Jeff Hyde – acoustic guitar
Jay Joyce – drum programming, Fender Rhodes, electric guitar, Hammond B-3 organ

Gary Morse – dobro, pedal steel guitar
Russ Pahl – dobro, pedal steel guitar
Mike Severs – acoustic guitar
Ed Smoak – electric guitar
Bryan Sutton – banjo, acoustic guitar, mandolin
Russell Terrell – background vocals
Ilya Toshinsky – banjo, acoustic guitar
Kenny Vaughan – electric guitar
Driver Williams – electric guitar
Craig Wright – drums, percussion
Jonathan Yudkin – fiddle

Production
Jay Joyce – producer
Reid Shippen – mixing (Soundstage Studios)
Andrew Mendelson – mastering (Georgetown Masters)
Scott Johnson – production assistance

Imagery
Joanna Carter – creative direction
Wendy Stamberger – art direction and design
Jim Wright – photography
Lee Moore – wardrobe
Debra Williams – grooming
Michelle Hall – art production
Jill Lamothe – art production

Charts

Weekly charts

Year-end charts

Certifications

References

2009 albums
Capitol Records albums
Eric Church albums
Albums produced by Jay Joyce